Catarete is a genus of wood midges in the family Cecidomyiidae. The one described species - Catarete brevinervis - is only known from  Sweden. The genus was established in 1929 by British entomologist Frederick Wallace Edwards.

References

Cecidomyiidae genera
Insects described in 1929
Taxa named by Frederick Wallace Edwards
Diptera of Europe
Monotypic Diptera genera